Pella recisa is a species of rove beetle in the genus Pella. It was described by Casey in 1911.

References

Aleocharinae
Beetles described in 1911